Lo-Fidelity Records is a record label founded in 2002 by Jeffrey Kotthoff

Based in North Aurora, Illinois, Lo-Fidelity specializes in limited edition releases, special edition reissues, and DVDs for artists.

Artists 
The following have released albums (CD, vinyl) or DVDs through Lo-Fidelity.
The 77s
Adam Again
Derri Daugherty
The Lost Dogs
 at the close of every day
Terry Scott Taylor
Bill Mallonee & Vigilantes of Love
Michael Roe
Kerosene Halo
Chris Taylor

Label catalog
Adam Again - Ten Songs By Adam Again, Re-Release (2002)
The Lost Dogs - Green Room Serenade, Part Tour (2002)
Terry Scott Taylor - Songs for the Day After Christmas (2002)
Derri Daugherty - A Few Unfinished Songs EP (2003)
The Lost Dogs - The Lost Dogs... Via Chicago DVD (2003)
Bill Mallonee & Vigilantes of Love - Need To Bleed EP (2003)
 at the close of every day - The Silja Symphony Limited Edition Vinyl (2004)
 at the close of every day - Live In Amsterdam Limited Edition CD (2004)
The Lost Dogs - MUTT CD (2004)
The 77s - DVD retrospective DVD (2006)
Terry Scott Taylor - Songs for the Day After Christmas (limited edition re-release) EP (2006)
The Lost Dogs - Via Chicago (All We Left Unsaid) DVD/CD (2006)
The 77s - Ninety Nine (limited edition [40 produced] 4-track EP; of 1999 live performance) (2007)
The 77s - Ninety Nine Live CD (8 track CD expanded from 4 track EP for full production run) (2007)
The Lost Dogs - The Lost Dogs... Via Chicago (limited edition re-release) DVD (2007)
The Lost Dogs - We Like To Have Christmas Christmas CD (2007)
The 77s - Holy Ghost Building CD (2008)
Michael Roe - We All Gonna Face The Rising Sun CD (2009)
The 77s - Working On The Building Limited Edition CD (2009)
The 77s - catalog download project Digital (2010 & ongoing)
Michael Roe - catalog download project Digital (2010 & ongoing)
Kerosene Halo - Kerosene Halo CD (2011)
The Lost Dogs - It Came From The Basement DVD/CD (2011)
The 77s - Sticks And Stones + This Is The Way Love Was  2 CD expanded re-release (2012)
The 77s - Seeds And Stems  limited edition bonus CD (2012)
The 77s - Echos O' Faith + Played Naked  2 CD expanded re-release (2012)
The 77s - Cornerstone Is Dead...Long Live Cornerstone  2 CD live release to commemorate the 77s playing at Cornerstone Festival (2012)
The 77s - Cornerstone Forever  limited edition live bonus CD (2012)
The 77s - Pray Naked  vinyl reissue, expanded CD reissue, "Naked & Unashamed" outtakes CD, "Watchnight Service" DVD (2017)

See also
 List of record labels

External links
 

American independent record labels
Record labels established in 2002
Rock record labels
Reissue record labels
Companies based in Chicago
2002 establishments in Illinois